Borj-e Seyyed (also known as Qal‘eh-i-Saiyid and Qal‘eh-ye Seyyed) is a village in Khesht Rural District, Khesht District, Kazerun County, Fars Province, Iran. At the 2006 census, its population was 281, in 65 families.

References 

Populated places in Kazerun County